Gabriel Portilho Borges (born 24 February 1992) is a Brazilian sailor. He and Marco Grael placed 11th in the 49er event at the 2016 Summer Olympics.

He represented Brazil at the 2020 Summer Olympics.

Notes

References

External links
 
 
 
 

1992 births
Living people
Brazilian male sailors (sport)
Olympic sailors of Brazil
Sailors at the 2016 Summer Olympics – 49er FX
Sailors at the 2020 Summer Olympics – 49er
Pan American Games medalists in sailing
Pan American Games gold medalists for Brazil
Sailors at the 2011 Pan American Games
Sailors at the 2019 Pan American Games
Medalists at the 2011 Pan American Games
Medalists at the 2019 Pan American Games
Snipe class world champions
World champions in sailing for Brazil
Sportspeople from Rio de Janeiro (city)
20th-century Brazilian people
21st-century Brazilian people